The following is a list of football stadiums in China, ordered by capacity. Currently football stadiums with a capacity of 5,000 or more are included.

Current stadiums

Under construction

See also 
 List of Asian stadiums by capacity
 List of association football stadiums by capacity
 List of stadiums in China
 List of home stadiums of China national football team

Notes

References 

 
China
Football stadiums in China
Football
stadiums